Andrew G. Reyes (born 13 November 1974) is a Liberian sprinter. He competed in the men's 4 × 100 metres relay at the 2000 Summer Olympics.

References

External links
 

1974 births
Living people
Athletes (track and field) at the 2000 Summer Olympics
Liberian male sprinters
Olympic athletes of Liberia
Place of birth missing (living people)